Krepinsky is a rural locality (a settlement) and the administrative center of Krepinskoye Rural Settlement, Kalachyovsky District, Volgograd Oblast, Russia. The population was 827 as of 2010. There are 13 streets.

Geography 
Krepinsky is located 74 km southeast of Kalach-na-Donu (the district's administrative centre) by road. Beloglinsky is the nearest rural locality.

References 

Rural localities in Kalachyovsky District